Sibiribaro  is a town and sub-prefecture in the Kérouané Prefecture in the Kankan Region of south-eastern Guinea. As of 2014 it had a population of 16,485 people.

References

Sub-prefectures of the Kankan Region